Rudolph H. Lavik (April 30, 1892 – September 29, 1979) was an American football and basketball coach and college athletics administrator. He served as the head football coach at Concordia College in Moorhead, Minnesota from 1920 to 1921, at Arizona State Teacher's College of Flagstaff—now known as Northern Arizona University—from 1928 to 1932, and at Arizona State Teachers College at Tempe—now known as Arizona State University—from 1933 to 1937, compiling a career college football record of 37–42–7. Lavik was also the head basketball coach at Arizona State Flagstaff (1927–1931), Colorado Agricultural College—now known as Colorado State University (1925–1928), and Arizona State Tempe (1933–1935, 1939–1948), tallying a career college basketball mark of 157–163. In addition he served as the athletic director at Arizona State from 1933 to 1949. He was a graduate of Springfield College in Springfield, Massachusetts.

Lavik was born on April 30, 1892 in Forman, North Dakota. He died in Mesa, Arizona on September 29, 1979.

Head coaching record

Football

References

1892 births
1979 deaths
American football tackles
American men's basketball coaches
American men's basketball players
Arizona State Sun Devils athletic directors
Arizona State Sun Devils football coaches
Arizona State Sun Devils men's basketball coaches
Basketball coaches from North Dakota
Basketball players from North Dakota
Colorado State Rams football coaches
Colorado State Rams men's basketball coaches
Concordia Cobbers football coaches
Northern Arizona Lumberjacks football coaches
Northern Arizona Lumberjacks men's basketball coaches
People from Sargent County, North Dakota
Players of American football from North Dakota
Springfield Pride football players
Springfield Pride men's basketball players